Chhattisgarh Football Association (CFA) is the state governing body of football in Chhattisgarh, India. It is affiliated with the All India Football Federation, the national governing body.

References 

Football in Chhattisgarh
Football governing bodies in India
Sports organizations established in 2000
2000 establishments in Chhattisgarh